Kayacı is a village in Erdemli district of Mersin Province, Turkey. The village is situated on the lower slopes of the Toros Mountains. The population of the village was 990 as of 2012.

There are Roman ruins around the village and a few kilometer west of the village there is a valley named after the village which is used as a picnic spot by Mersin citizens.

References

Villages in Erdemli District